Paul Blackburn may refer to:
 Paul Blackburn (poet) (1926–1971), American poet
 Paul Blackburn (cricketer) (born 1934), English cricketer
 Paul Blackburn (musician), with English group Gomez
 Paul Blackburn (overturned conviction) (born 1963), youth convicted of attempted murder in 1978, cleared and released in 2005
 Paul Blackburn (baseball) (born 1993), American baseball player
 Paul P. Blackburn, commander of the United States Seventh Fleet in 1965